Zoltán Romhányi (born February 22, 1954) is a Hungarian sprint canoer who competed from the mid-1970s to the early 1980s. He won two medals in the K-4 10000 m at the ICF Canoe Sprint World Championships with a silver in 1974 and a bronze in 1979.

Romhányi also competed in two Summer Olympics, earning his best finish of eighth twice (K-2 500 m: 1980, K-4 1000 m: 1976).

References

Sports-reference.com profile

1954 births
Canoeists at the 1976 Summer Olympics
Canoeists at the 1980 Summer Olympics
Hungarian male canoeists
Living people
Olympic canoeists of Hungary
ICF Canoe Sprint World Championships medalists in kayak
20th-century Hungarian people